The orienteering competition at the 2022 World Games took place in July 2022, in Birmingham, United States, at the Birmingham Southern College, Oak Mountain State Park and Railroad Park.
Originally scheduled to take place in July 2021, the Games were rescheduled for July 2022 as a result of the 2020 Summer Olympics postponement due to the COVID-19 pandemic.

Qualification

Participating nations

Medal table

Medalists

Men

Women

Mixed

References

External links
 The World Games 2022
 International Orienteering Federation
 Results book

 
2022 World Games